Larry B. Seabrook is a former New York City Councilman from District 12 in New York City which covers the Co-op City, Williamsbridge, Wakefield, Edenwald, Baychester, and Eastchester sections of the Northeast Bronx, from 2002 until 2012. A Democrat from Co-op City in the Bronx, he has held several elected offices: With his election to the city council in 2001, Seabrook became the first African-American politician to hold office in three separate legislative branches of government, both on municipal and statewide levels.

In 2010, Seabrook was indicted by the federal government on corruption charges. He was convicted on nine felony counts on July 26, 2012, subsequently removed from the city council, and served 3 years and in prison.

Education

Seabrook earned an associate's degree from Kingsborough Community College, a bachelor's degree in History and Urban Studies from John Jay College of Criminal Justice, a master's degree from Long Island University, and J.D. from CUNY Law School.

He was an administrator and instructor at Marist College; and an adjunct professor at John Jay College of Criminal Justice.

Political career
Seabrook was first elected to office in 1984, winning a seat in the New York State Assembly and representing a district in the Bronx that was heavily African-American. Seabrook defeated the 10-year incumbent Vincent A. Marchiselli in the Democratic primary. He was a member of the Assembly from 1985 to 1996, sitting in the 186th, 187th, 188th, 189th, 190th and 191st New York State Legislatures.

During his assembly tenure, he created the "Drug Trader Arrests and Conviction Program" that led to over a thousand drug-related arrests and liberated Bronx neighborhoods from the scourge of drugs, drug-related crimes and violence. This model program won strong bi-partisan support and recognition, and earned editorial praise from the Daily News, which declared, "If ever there was a gold medal in the war against drugs, Assemblyman Larry Seabrook should be considered."

In 1989, Seabrook led a coalition of 18 members of the New York State Assembly calling upon Attorney General Robert Abrams to impose a $150 million fine on Drexel Burnham Lambert, the Wall Street investment firm, for violations of state securities law. He also investigated and found a pervasive pattern of employment agency discrimination in the state. His findings were reported to Attorney General Abrams.

In 1991, Leonard Jeffries, the former head of the Black Studies Department at the City College of CUNY, and a professor there since 1972, expressed views many considered to be racist and anti-Semitic. On August 26, 1991, Seabrook released a public statement of condemnation: "The recent comments by Dr. Leonard Jeffries, in my opinion, are defamatory and appear to be a base appeal to bigotry. I therefore, deplore the remarks as I would any remarks of this kind whether uttered by David Duke or Dr. Leonard Jeffries." At the time, Seabrook was the only African-American member of the legislature to denounce the statements.

In 1994, Seabrook publicly rebuked the Bronx Party Democratic County political organization run by Assemblyman George Friedman. In a letter to the New York Times, Seabrook alleged that the organization had engaged in "abuse of power" and colluded with "so-called" reformers in efforts to thwart the enforcement of the federal Voting Rights Act, which he deemed to be an act of "political hypocrisy."

On February 15, 1996, Seabrook was elected to the New York State Senate to fill the vacancy caused by the death of Joseph L. Galiber. He was re-elected twice and remained in the Senate until 2000, sitting in the 191st, 192nd and 193rd New York State Legislatures.

In 1996 and 1998, Seabrook considered challenging Congressman Eliot Engel in the Democratic primary, but backed out both times. In 2000, Seabrook gave up his seat in the State Senate and finally challenged Engel, who fell out of favor with the Bronx Democratic Party organization. In a bitter campaign, Engel defeated Seabrook in the Democratic primary. However, Seabrook tallied 41 percent of the vote, easily the closest primary contest Engel had faced at the time.

In 2001, Seabrook was elected to the New York City Council. He was re-elected to the Council in 2005 and in 2009 (the last time was after the term-limits law was amended to allow for a third term).

In February 2002, Seabrook introduced city council legislation to block the sale of Syrian merchandise in New York City, a move intended to punish their state support of terrorism. Two months later, Bronx Congressman Eliot Engel introduced the 2002 Syrian Accountability Act to limit trade with Syria 

As a New York City Councilman, Seabrook also exposed discrimination in hiring by advertising agencies in New York.

He was a delegate to the 2004 Democratic National Convention.

On February 9, 2010, a federal grand jury indicted Seabrook on 13 counts of money laundering, extortion, and fraud. Seabrook pleaded not guilty to the charges and was released after posting $500,000 bail. In July 2012, he was convicted on nine charges and the following January, he was sentenced to five years in prison and ordered to pay $620,000 in restitution. He reported to prison on March 8, 2013, and after accounting for time off for good behavior, was released on July 14, 2017.

References

External links
 Federal Bureau of Prisons, inmate locator, register number 63107-054

New York City Council members
Democratic Party members of the New York State Assembly
Democratic Party New York (state) state senators
African-American state legislators in New York (state)
Living people
Politicians convicted of mail and wire fraud
New York (state) politicians convicted of corruption
New York (state) politicians convicted of crimes
People from Co-op City, Bronx
Politicians from the Bronx
1951 births
21st-century African-American people
20th-century African-American people
African-American New York City Council members